The Rhonestock is a mountain of the Uri Alps, located on the border between the Swiss cantons of Valais and Uri and belongs to the Winterberg massif. It lies south of the Dammastock, between the Rhone Glacier and the Damma Glacier.

The mountain is composed of two summits: the Hinterer Rhonestock (3,588 m) and the Vorderer Rhonestock (3,566 m).

References

External links
 Rhonestock on Hikr

Mountains of the Alps
Alpine three-thousanders
Mountains of Switzerland
Mountains of Valais
Mountains of the canton of Uri
Uri–Valais border